Metethoheptazine (WY-535) is an opioid analgesic from the phenazepine family. It was invented in the 1960s.

Metethoheptazine produces similar effects to other opioids, including analgesia, sedation, dizziness and nausea.

Metethoheptazine is not listed as a controlled substance under the Controlled Substances Act 1970 in the United States.  The Canadian Controlled Drugs and Substances Act specifically excludes the phenazepine opioids from control.

References

Synthetic opioids
Azepanes
Ethyl esters
Mu-opioid receptor agonists